Moshrageh Rural District is a rural district (dehestan) in Moshrageh District, Ramshir County, Khuzestan Province, Iran. At the 2006 census, its population was 4,991, in 902 families.  The rural district has 17 villages.

References 

Rural Districts of Khuzestan Province
Ramshir County